The tenth season of the American horror anthology television series American Horror Story, subtitled Double Feature (stylised in the opening credits with the alternate subtitle Chapter 10), focuses on a family in 2021 in Provincetown, Massachusetts, in its first part, Red Tide, where they meet the town's true inhabitants, and later, in its second half, Death Valley, in a group of camping students who find themselves in a conspiracy involving extraterrestrials. The ensemble cast includes veterans Sarah Paulson, Evan Peters, Lily Rabe, Finn Wittrock, Frances Conroy, Billie Lourd, Leslie Grossman, Adina Porter and Angelica Ross, as well as newcomers Macaulay Culkin, Ryan Kiera Armstrong, Neal McDonough, Kaia Gerber, Nico Greetham, Isaac Powell, Rachel Hilson, and Rebecca Dayan.

Created by Ryan Murphy and Brad Falchuk for cable network FX, the series is produced by 20th Television. Double Feature was broadcast between August 25 to October 20, 2021, consisting of 10 episodes. Originally scheduled to premiere in late 2020, its production was delayed as result of the COVID-19 pandemic. The season received very positive reviews during the onset of its first part, Red Tide, with some critics praising it as a return to the series' form. However, the finale of Red Tide received very negative reviews for its rushed and abrupt ending. Death Valley received mixed reviews throughout, with criticism towards its storytelling, writing, and ending.

Cast and characters

Part 1: Red Tide

Main
 Sarah Paulson as Tuberculosis Karen
 Evan Peters as Austin Sommers
 Lily Rabe as Doris Gardner
 Finn Wittrock as Harry Gardner
 Frances Conroy as Sarah Cunningham / Belle Noir
 Billie Lourd as Leslie "Lark" Feldman
 Leslie Grossman as Ursula Khan
 Adina Porter as Chief Burleson
 Angelica Ross as the Chemist
 Macaulay Culkin as Mickey
 Ryan Kiera Armstrong as Alma Gardner

Recurring
 Denis O'Hare as Holden Vaughn
 Robin Weigert as Martha Edwards
 Spencer Novich as Vlad
 Kayla Blake as Doctor A. Jordan

Guest
 Rachel Finninger as Melanie
 Blake Shields as Tony
 Jim Ortlieb as Ray Cunningham
 David Huggard as Crystal DeCanter
 Dot-Marie Jones as Trooper Jan Remy
 Benjamin Papac as Rory

Part 2: Death Valley

Main
 Sarah Paulson as Mamie Eisenhower
 Lily Rabe as Amelia Earhart
 Leslie Grossman as Calico
 Angelica Ross as Theta
 Neal McDonough as Dwight D. Eisenhower
 Kaia Gerber as Kendall Carr
 Nico Greetham as Cal Cambon
 Isaac Powell as Troy Lord
 Rachel Hilson as Jamie Howard
 Rebecca Dayan as Maria Wycoff

Recurring
 Cody Fern as Valiant Thor
 Craig Sheffer as Richard Nixon
 Christopher Stanley as Sherman Adams
 Mike Vogel as John F. Kennedy
 Alisha Soper as Marilyn Monroe

Guest
 Len Cordova as Steve Jobs
 John Sanders as Buzz Aldrin
 Bryce Johnson as Neil Armstrong
 Karl Makinen as Lyndon B. Johnson
 Jeff Heapy as Stanley Kubrick
 Vincent Foster as Henry Kissinger

Episodes

Production

Development
On August 3, 2018, the series was renewed for a 10th season, set to air in 2020. On May 26, 2020, it was announced that season 10 would be pushed back to 2021 due to production being stalled as a result of the COVID-19 pandemic. Following the interruption, series co-creator Ryan Murphy told in an interview with TheWrap that the delay could potentially change the season's theme, since his initial idea needed to be filmed during the warmer months of the year. The following month, Murphy unveiled a promotional poster for the season via his Instagram account; the image features a wide-open mouth with razor-sharp teeth while a hand is tattooing "AHS 10" on the tongue. The tenth season has received an estimated amount of $48 million in tax credits under the California Film Association's "Program 2.0" initiative. On March 19, 2021, Murphy revealed the seasons's title to be Double Feature; it will encompass two different stories, "one by the sea, one by the sand." Later, on Instagram, Murphy referred to "Double Feature" as "Two seasons for the fans airing in one calendar year[...] So double the viewing pleasure. One set by the sea (this cast has already been announced). A second by the sand (that cast announcement coming)."
On June 24, 2021, FX released the first promotional poster for the season, depicting a female humanoid creature french kissing an alien with a black pill resting on her tongue. On July 6, 2021, FX unveiled a promotional video, disclosing new footage from their upcoming slate of television. The promotional video unveiled footage of the characters portrayed by Sarah Paulson, Leslie Grossman, Lily Rabe, Finn Wittrock, Frances Conroy, and Evan Peters, respectively. On July 27, 2021, the first official teaser was released on social media, confirming the titles of the two parts as Red Tide and Death Valley, respectively. Red Tide spanned over the first six episodes and Death Valley over the last four episodes. On August 13, 2021, the official trailer for Red Tide was released.

Casting

In November 2019, Murphy announced that some cast members from the first three seasons may return for the upcoming tenth season, saying, "[T]he people who helped build this show into what it is, who believed in it from the beginning, have been contacted and are interested. So, if you look at the iconography of the first three seasons, you can figure who I've gone to and who might be coming back." He also said that the tenth season would be "about reuniting fan-favorite actors to come back." Later that day, Paulson confirmed that she would be returning to the series for its 10th season in a lead role. On February 26, 2020, Murphy published a video in his Instagram account revealing that Grossman, Peters, Rabe, Wittrock, along with Kathy Bates, Billie Lourd, Adina Porter, Angelica Ross, and series newcomer Macaulay Culkin were cast in the 10th season. In a May 2020 interview with E! Online, Murphy revealed that Culkin accepted his role after Murphy told him the character's personality over the phone. He affirmed, "I told him he has crazy, erotic sex with Kathy Bates and does other things. And he paused and he goes, 'This sounds like the role I was born to play.' So, he signed up right then and there." On November 18, 2020, Murphy announced the casting of Spencer Novich. On February 5, 2021, Conroy was confirmed to return in season 10, replacing the role Bates was to play. On March 20, 2021, Murphy confirmed via Instagram that former series regular Denis O'Hare would return for the first time since Roanoke.
On June 15, 2021, Neal McDonough joined the cast as a series regular.

Filming
It was initially reported that production was scheduled to resume filming in October 2020; however, Rabe confirmed to Digital Spy that filming for the season would start on December 2, 2020. On July 20, 2021, it was reported that production has been temporarily halted due to a positive COVID-19 case and potential exposure to the illness. Filming resumed a week later and concluded on September 27, 2021.

Release
The season premiered on August 25, 2021.

Reception

Critical response
The review aggregator website Rotten Tomatoes reports an 80% approval rating, based on 61 reviews for the season, with an average rating of 9.00/10. The site's critical consensus reads: "Though its second tale is still a mystery, the first half of Double Feature proves a spine-tingling good time with terrific performances." 

Liz Shannon Miller of Collider stated Double Feature manages to be one of the best American Horror Story seasons ever created, writing, "For 10 seasons now, American Horror Story has represented the wildest excesses of the Ryan Murphy brand — incredible casts, deliberately outlandish premises and plots, and experiments in form which explode the ideas of what's possible on television." Riley Runnells of The Post praised the performances of the actors and complimented the writing, claiming, "The vibe of the show is almost more of a movie style and more professional-seeming than any other season so far. Not only are there incredible acting and technical moments, but the writing seems more polished and original than the more recent seasons of the show – especially the fresh take on a vampire plot." Andy Swift of TVLine applauded the performances of the cast members and stated the season succeeds to be terrifying, saying, "Chilling, compelling and wonderfully acted, Double Feature already feels like a return to form for the long-running franchise." Kayla Cobb of Decider said Double Feature succeeds to be frightening across its jumpscares and characters, while praising the performances of the actors, stating, "If you’re into American Horror Story for the horror, you’re going to have a blast. If not, then Double Feature has some killer performances from your favorites that you won’t want to miss."

Matt Fowler of IGN rated the season 7 out of 10, stating, "The first two episodes of the first half of American Horror Story: Double Feature start slow, but then amplify the intrigue with an interesting spin on vampires." Ron Hogan of Den of Geek rated the season 3 out of 5 stars, saying, "There are some very clever transitions between scenes, and the episode has good flow without getting slowed down during exposition dumps. The effects are used as appropriate punchlines, and American Horror Story is never shy about blood and gore when necessary. It (the half-season, not the episode) just felt a little too rushed, with too many ideas and not quite enough development."

Accolades 

In its tenth season, the series has been nominated for five awards, winning one.

Ratings

Notes

References

External links
 
 

2020s American drama television series
2021 American television seasons
Alien abduction in television
10
Cultural depictions of Dwight D. Eisenhower
Cultural depictions of John F. Kennedy
Cultural depictions of Richard Nixon
Cultural depictions of Marilyn Monroe
Human experimentation in fiction
Mariticide in fiction
Patricide in fiction
Suicide in television
Television productions postponed due to the COVID-19 pandemic
Television shows set in Massachusetts
Vampires in television
Works about addiction